The 1985–86 Challenge Cup was the 85th staging of rugby league's oldest knockout competition, the Challenge Cup. Known as the Silk Cut Challenge Cup for sponsorship reasons,. The Preliminary, 1st and 2nd rounds. and Quarter-finals was hit by the Winter of 1985-86 in Great Britain and Ireland with the preliminary round ties not being completed until 31 January and the 1st Round not being completed until 26 February and the first round had a major upset in the form of 2nd Division Doncaster knocking out 1st Division Salford winning 18-12 at home however only 842 spectators were there to see it and only 2 2nd Round ties being played on 23 February with 1 1st Round tie being played the day before on 22 February in front of the BBC Grandstand cameras the other 2 being played on 24 and 26 February and the remaining 2nd Round ties being played between 8–12 March 1986 (including a replay). This meant that the Quarter-finals were not played until 16 March 1986 (with a replay on 19 March 1986) with no television coverage this led to the Last 16, Quarter-finals and the Semi-finals being played on consecutive weekends for the first time in the Challenge Cup's 89-year history. The final on 3 May 1986 was contested by Castleford and  Hull Kingston Rovers at Wembley. Castleford won the match 15–14.

Preliminary round

First round

Second round

Third round

Semi-final

Replay

Final

References

External links
Challenge Cup official website 
Challenge Cup 1985/86 results at Rugby League Project

Challenge Cup
Challenge Cup